The following is a partial list of notable University of Rhode Island people. It includes alumni, professors, and others associated with the University of Rhode Island.

Notable alumni

Politics and government 

 Lincoln Almond (B.Sc. 1959), Governor of Rhode Island from 1995 to 2003
Sandra Cano (M.P.A. 2012), Member of the Rhode Island Senate from the 8th district
Peter Courtney (B.A. 1965), 55th President of the Oregon State Senate (2003–present), Member of the Oregon Senate (1991–present)
Frank Edelblut (B.Sc. 1983), Commissioner of the New Hampshire Department of Education
Jorge Elorza (B.Sc. 1998), 38th Mayor of Providence, Rhode Island
 Charles J. Fogarty (M.P.A. 1980), Lieutenant Governor of Rhode Island 1999–2006
 J. Joseph Garrahy (1953), Governor of Rhode Island from 1977 to 1985
 William B. Gould IV (B.A. 1958), Chairman of the National Labor Relations Board 1994–1998
 Candace Owens, conservative commentator and political activist (did not graduate)
 Edwin R. Pacheco (B.A. 2005), Chairman of Rhode Island Democratic Party 2010–2013
 Donna M. Walsh, Former Rhode Island State Representative
 Robert Weygand (B.Sc., B.F.A., M.A, M.P.A.) Lieutenant Governor of RI 1993–1997, U.S. Representative from RI 1997–2001.
Alton W. Wiley (1951), First Black judge to on the Rhode Island District and Superior courts
George Wiley (1953), civil rights leader and chemist

Arts, broadcast and entertainment 

 Masta Ace (1988), rapper
Stevie Aiello, songwriter and musician
 Kim Alexis, model
 Christiane Amanpour (B.A. 1983), journalist and CNN correspondent
 Steve Cascione (B.A. 1977), television news anchor
 Angelo Cataldi (B.A. 1972), sports radio personality 
Amanda Clayton, actress
 Vladimir Duthiers (B.A. 1991), journalist
 Benjamin Fine (B.Sc. 1928), journalist
 Mat Franco (2010), magician
 Sage Francis (1999), rapper
 Peter Frechette (B.F.A.), actor
 Matt Gallant (B.A. 1987), television host
 John M. Geddes (B.A. 1974), journalist and managing editor of The New York Times from 2003 to 2013
 Leila Goldkuhl, model
 Jose B. Gonzalez (Ph.D. 1998), poet
 Donald M. Grant (1949), publisher
 Ann Hood (B.A. 1978), novelist
 John King (B.A. 1985), television journalist
 Kevin Kelly, magazine editor
 J. Michael Lennon (M.A. 1969, Ph.D. 1975), writer and editor
 Tony Longo, actor
 Theo Martins (2009), singer and rapper
 Freddie Scott, singer
 Michael P. Shawver (born 1984/1985), film editor
 J. T. Walsh, actor

Sports 

 Lou Abbruzzi (1941) – Former NFL player for the Boston Yanks
 Pat Abbruzzi (1955) – Former CFL player for the Montreal Alouettes
 Jimmy Baron – Played in the NBA Summer League for the Utah Jazz and Washington Wizards. He is currently playing basketball for Lagun Aro GBC in Spain's ACB League. He is the all-time three-point shooter in the University of Rhode Island and Atlantic 10 history.
 Tavorris Bell (2001) –  Streetball player featured in the AND1 Mixtape Tour Volume 2 video.
David Bernsley (born 1969) - American-Israeli basketball player
 Parfait Bitee – Former point guard for URI, also played on the Cameroonian men's national basketball team that won the silver medal at the FIBA Africa Championship 2007
 Andy Boss (B.A. 1992) – Former professional racing driver in Indy Lights and IMSA
 Danleigh Borman (2008) – MLS player for Toronto FC
 Geoff Cameron – MLS player for Houston Dynamo, MLS All-Star in 2009 and 2011, member and starter on the 2014 World Cup US Men's National Soccer Team.
 Todd Bozeman – Head Coach, Morgan State University men's basketball
 Ernie Calverley – Former NBA player with the Providence Steamrollers, former URI Head Coach
 Derek Cassidy – Former Arena Football League player
 Jim Christian – Former Head Coach of Boston College men's basketball
 Steve Chubin – Former NBA player for the Indiana Pacers
 Sean Colson – Former NBA player for the Atlanta Hawks and the Houston Rockets
 Tony DeLuca – Former NFL player for the Green Bay Packers
 Shelagh Donohoe – Olympic athlete, current Women's rowing head coach.
 Mike Dwyer – Former NFL player for the Dallas Cowboys
 Johnny Ezersky – Former NBA player for the Providence Steamrollers, the Baltimore Bullets, and the Boston Celtics
 Frank Ferrara – Former NFL defensive end for New York Giants and Hollywood stunt man
 Jason Foster – Former NFL player
 Steve Furness – Former NFL player for Pittsburgh Steelers and the Detroit Lions
 Tom Garrick – Former NBA player for the San Antonio Spurs, and Los Angeles Clippers
 Sasha Gotsmanov – MLS player for the Colorado Rapids
 Virgil Gray – Arena Football League player
 Andy Gresh – Sports analyst, Fox Sports, WSKO, ESPN Radio, Patriots Rock Radio Network
 P. H. Horgan III – PGA Tour golfer
 Chester Jaworski – Basketball player, led the nation in scoring in his senior season, also won national player of the year award in his senior season.
 Frank Keaney – Former URI men's basketball coach, inventor of URI's team color Keaney Blue, and Basketball Hall of Fame member.
 Cuttino Mobley – Former NBA player for the Los Angeles Clippers, Houston Rockets, Sacramento Kings, and the New York Knicks
 Rick Moser – Former NFL player
 Xavier Munford (born 1992) - basketball player for Hapoel Tel Aviv of the Israeli Basketball Premier League
 Pat Narduzzi – Head football coach for the University of Pittsburgh Panthers
 Lamar Odom (1997–98) – 2 time NBA Champion for the Los Angeles Lakers and recipient of the 6th Man of the Year Award. Drafted by the Los Angeles Clippers
 Josh Oppenheimer – Israeli-American professional basketball coach, and former professional basketball player
 Tom Penders – Former college basketball coach
 Stephen Peterson – Rower on the 1996 U.S. Olympic team and Gold Medal winner at the 1990 World Rowing Championships
 Dana Quigley – PGA Tour golfer
 Dawan Robinson – NBA player (point guard) for the Los Angeles Clippers
 Ron Rothstein – Former coach in the NBA for the Miami Heat and the Detroit Pistons, first coach of the Miami Heat
 Kahiem Seawright – Former forward for URI, currently playing professional basketball for Valladolid in Spain's ACB League
 Bob Shea – Former NBA player for the Providence Steamrollers
 Dave Stenhouse, Former Major League Baseball pitcher with the Washington Senators from 1962 to 1964 and coach of the Brown University baseball team from 1981 to 1990.
 Stanley Stutz – Former NBA player for the New York Knicks
Jared Terrell (born 1995) - basketball player in the Israeli Basketball Premier League
 Tyson Wheeler – Former NBA player for the Toronto Raptors
 Bob White – Former NFL player
 Andy Williams – MLS player for Real Salt Lake, formerly for Columbus Crew
 Jeff Williams – Former NFL player
 Sly Williams – Former NBA player for New York Knicks, Atlanta Hawks, and Boston Celtics

Business 

 Robert Crandall (1960), former president and chairman of the board, American Airlines
 Michael D. Fascitelli, President and Trustee of Vornado Realty Trust
 Giovanni Feroce (1991), former CEO of Alex and Ani
 Tony Horton (1980), fitness guru and developer of P90X
 Nancy McKinstry (1980), chairman and CEO of Wolters Kluwer
 Olivier Pastré, French economist and banker
 Thomas Ryan (1975), former CEO of CVS Corporation

Science and academia 

 Daniel G. Aldrich (1939), founding chancellor of University of California, Irvine
 Kimberly Arcand (1997), data visualizer and science communicator
Robert Ballard (PhD 1975, Hon. 1986), oceanographer, discoverer of the RMS Titanic, Professor and Director of URI's Center for Ocean Exploration, part of URI's Graduate School of Oceanography.
 Martha Banks (M.A. 1978, PhD 1980), clinical psychologist
 Roxanne Johnson (M.S. 1997), chemist working at the United States Environmental Protection Agency
 James W. Carey (B.Sc.), media theorist
Elizabeth A. Craig, professor and chair of biochemistry at University of Wisconsin–Madison and member of the National Academy of Sciences
 Deneb Karentz, (B.Sc. 1973, PhD 1982), professor and chair of biological sciences at University of San Francisco
 Cornelius M. Kerwin, (M.A. 1973), President of American University (2007–2017)
 Frederick G. Keyes, (B.Sc. 1906), Professor and Lecturer in Physics and Chemistry at MIT
 George H. M. Lawrence, (B.Sc. MSc, 1952) was a United States botanist, author and Professor of Botany. Established the Hunt Botanical Library and the Huntia (journal)
 Herbert Lovett, (P.h.D) was an American ppsychologist
 Catalina Martinez, (B.Sc. 1996, MSc. 1999, M.M.A. 2001, M.B.A. 2014), Regional Program Manager for the National Oceanic and Atmospheric Administration's Office of Ocean Exploration and Research.
 Janice Merrill-Oldham (M.L.S. 1984), Malloy-Rabinowitz Preservation Librarian at the Harvard Library (1995–2010)
 Robert B. Rheault, Jr., (Ph.D. 1996), marine biologist and aquaculture consultant
 Stuart Vyse, (PhD 1987), psychologist, teacher, speaker and author who specializes in belief in superstitions and critical thinking.
 Sandra Thornton Whitehouse, (Ph.D. 1994), marine biologist and wife of Senator Sheldon Whitehouse

Military 

 Admiral Jeremy M. "Mike" Boorda (B.A. 1971), 25th Chief of Naval Operations
General Charles A. Flynn (B.Sc. 1985)
 Lieutenant General Michael T. Flynn (B.Sc. 1981), Director, Defense Intelligence Agency (former), National Security Advisor for President Donald Trump (former).
 General Leon J. LaPorte, United States Army four-star general
 Rear Admiral Francis D. "Bill" Moran, third director of the National Oceanic and Atmospheric Administration Commissioned Officer Corps
 Rear Admiral Sigmund R. Petersen, fourth director of the National Oceanic and Atmospheric Administration Commissioned Officer Corps

Faculty 

 Judith A. Boss, writer
 James Cooley, mathematician
 Fritz Eichenberg, illustrator
 Peniel E. Joseph, historian
 Robert Leuci, former detective with the New York City Police Department
 Margaret Mead, Distinguished Professor of Sociology and Anthropology
 Igor Sikorsky, aviation pioneer
 Bruce Sundlun, 71st Governor of Rhode Island
 William Wallace Wotherspoon, Chief of Staff of the United States Army

Presidents

References 

University of Rhode Island
University of Rhode Island